Prisoner B-3087 is a young adult biography of Jake Gruner during World War ll by Alan Gratz. Prisoner B-3087 was published by Scholastic Inc in 2013.

Summary 
Yanak Gruener is a ten-year-old boy living in Kraków, Poland in 1939 when Adolf Hitler invaded, starting WW2. Once the Nazi Party takes over the city Yanak and his family are forced to live in the Krakow Ghetto, with other Jewish families. For three years, Yanak lived in cramped small two-bedroom apartments housing 20 people of different families, watching other families and loved ones being taken to different concentration camps, knowing they were not returning. When Yanak was thirteen years old, he and his uncle were taken to the Plaszow Concentration Camp where they worked in the tailor shops making uniforms for the German soldiers and fellow prisoners. While in Plaszow, Yanak and his uncle hid under a loose floorboard to escape work detail, and is later said by Jake that he truly believes that hiding is what saved him, for if he could survive Amon Goeth then he could survive it all. After the death of his uncle, he was employed through the concentration camp to work in an enamelware factory by a man named Oskar Schindler. Sadly he was transferred away from Plaszow three months before Schindler started to save the Jewish prisoners who worked in his factory.

After one year in the Plaszow Concentration Camp, Yanak was moved to the Wieliczka Salt Mine and worked in the mines for a short time until he was moved to Trzebinia Concentration Camp. The Nazi soldiers and Kapos treated the prisoners like a game. Yanak spent his days digging pits for his fellow prisoners when they inevitably died. After less than a year in Trzebinia, Yanak and the other prisoners were shoved into cattle cars and transported to Birkenau Concentration camp. Once he arrived, Yanak and the other Jewish prisoners were led into the shower. Believing they were to die, they started to yell at the guards, telling they to kill them. Instead, they were met with water, after which they were given new clothes and shoes and Yanak got his B-3087 tattoo. While in Birkenau, Yanak stood with a 10 year old boy during his bar mitzvah and worked to keep himself alive until he was moved from Birkenau sister camp Auschwitz.

Yanak and fellow prisoners walked to his sixth concentration camp Auschwitz stopping along the way to pick up more Jewish prisoners. There he was moved to the right by Dr. Mengele along with the rest of the men. After surviving Auschwitz he was part of a 2 week long death march to Sechsenhausen Concentration Camp. Shortly after arriving he was forced back into a cattle car and sent to Bergen-Belsen Concentration Camp. There, due to their poor health and weak bodies, the Nazi official ordered all the Jewish prisoners to not work for a week and instead eat and regain their strength. Shortly after he was shoved back into a cattle car and sent off to Buchenwald Concentration Camp. Unlike the other concentration camps Buchenwald was open to the public as a zoo ran by Karl Koch and his wife, nicknamed "the witch of Buchenwald". After surviving the witch of Buchenwald Yanak was once again placed in a cattle car and sent to Gross-Rosen Concentration Camp where Yanak lost a button on his jacket and got 20 lashes before he was sent on his second death march. This time he was sent to Dachau Concentration camp where he was eventually saved from imprisonment by American soldiers.

Themes 
Gratz discussed various concentration camps that the main character spent time at throughout WW2. The 10 concentration camps that Yanek was sent to were:
 Plaszow Concentration Camp
 Wieliczka Salt Mine
 Trzebinia Concentration Camp
 Birkenau Concentration camp
 Auschwitz Concentration Camp
 Sechsenhausen Concentration Camp
 Bergen-Belsen Concentration Camp
 Buchenwald Concentration Camp
 Gross-Risen Concentration Camp
 Dachau Concentration camp
Gratz introduces significant people from this time such as Amon Goeth, Dr. Mengele, Karl Koch, Ilse Koch, and Oskar Schindler.

Reception 
Prisoner B-3087 received significant attention since its publication in 2013.  This book received the following awards:
 YALSA’s 2014 Best Fiction for Young Adults
 2014 Bank Street Best Children’s Books of the Year
 2014-2015 Pennsylvania Young Reader’s Choice Awards Winner
 2014-2015 Nebraska Golden Sower Award Winner
 2014-2015 New Hampshire Isinglass Teen Read Award Winner
 2015-2016 South Carolina Junior Book Award Winner
 2015-2016 Arizona Grand Canyon Reader Award Winner
 2015-2016 Missouri Truman Readers Award Winner
 2015-2016 Virginia Readers Choice Awards Winner
 2015-2016 Tennessee Volunteer State Book Award Winner
 2015-2016 Georgia Children’s Book Award Nominee
 2015-2016 Eliot Rosewater Indiana High School Book Award nominee
 2014-2015 Iowa Teen Award Nominee
 2014-2015 Wisconsin Golden Archer Award Nominee
 2017-2018 North Carolina Battle of the Books List
 2014-2016 North Carolina Battle of the Books List
 2014 SIBA Book Awards Long List
 2014 IRA Young Adult Choices Reading List
 2013 Cybils Middle Grade Fiction Finalist
 2013-2014 Georgia Tome Society It List
 Spring 2013 Parents’ Choice Awards – Recommended Seal

References 

Holocaust literature
Young adult non-fiction books